Fabio Pisacane (born 28 January 1986) is an Italian football coach and former player, who played as a defender. He is currently working for Cagliari as a technical collaborator.

Playing career
Pisacane started his career at Genoa, where he was initially a member of the team's youth system. At the age of 14, however, he was diagnosed with Guillain-Barré syndrome, which seriously threatened his career, as it caused him to experience temporary paralysis in his limbs. After recovering, he was promoted to the reserve side, where he remained from 2003 to 2005. He made his professional debut during the 2005–06 season, while on loan with Ravenna. After several seasons in Serie C, he was signed by Chievo on a free transfer in 2008, but joined Lumezzane in a co-ownership deal, along with his Chievo teammates Tommaso Chiecchi and Amedeo Calliari. During the 2009–10 season, he left for Serie B side Ancona. During the 2010–11 season, he remained at Lumezzane along with Francesco Checcucci.

In June 2011, Lumezzane purchased the remaining 50% registration rights for Pisacane from Chievo, while Chievo bought back Checcucci. In his sole season with Lumezzane, he refused €50,000 to defeat his own team against Ravenna, becoming a hero, along with Simone Farina, of the illegal betting war; the two players were later rewarded by being named FIFA ambassadors in 2012, while Pisacane was even invited by manager Cesare Prandelli to train with the Italy national football team later that year.

In August 2011, he terminated his contract with Lumezzane. The next day, he was signed by Ternana on a one-year contract, rejoining former teammate Davide Carcuro. He won Lega Pro Prima Divisione and was the losing side of Supercoppa di Lega di Prima Divisione.

On 14 June 2012, he extended his contract. On 11 July 2013, he was signed by Avellino, where he remained for two seasons.

On 14 July 2015, he was signed by Cagliari. He helped the club obtain promotion to Serie A during his first season with the side, and subsequently made his Serie A debut in a 3–0 win over Atalanta, on 18 September 2016 the following season, at the age of 30; having finally achieved his childhood dream of playing in the top Italian division, he was moved to tears during the post-match interview. In 2016, Pisacane was named the inaugural winner of The Guardian'''s Footballer of the Year award, which is given to "a player who has done something truly remarkable, whether by overcoming adversity, helping others or setting a sporting example by acting with exceptional honesty".

On 19 January 2021, Pisacane signed with Serie B club Lecce. He made 10 appearances with the giallorossi in 2020–21 Serie B season, but was left out of the squad for the next season. On 8 February 2022, his contract with the club was terminated by mutual consent.

Coaching career
On 8 June 2022, Pisacane took on his first non-playing role, signing for Cagliari as a technical collaborator to new head coach Fabio Liverani.

Honours
IndividualThe Guardian'' Footballer of the Year: 2016

References

External links
 Career summary by lega-calcio.it

Living people
1986 births
Footballers from Naples
Association football defenders
Italian footballers
Genoa C.F.C. players
Ravenna F.C. players
U.S. Cremonese players
S.S. Virtus Lanciano 1924 players
A.C. ChievoVerona players
A.C. Ancona players
Ternana Calcio players
U.S. Avellino 1912 players
Cagliari Calcio players
U.S. Lecce players
Serie B players
Serie C players
Serie A players
People with Guillain–Barré syndrome